Fauja Singh  is a British Sikh and retired marathon runner of Punjabi Indian descent. He has beaten a number of world records in multiple age brackets, but none of his times have been ratified as records. His personal best time for the London Marathon (2003) is 6 hours 2 minutes, and his marathon best, claimed for the 90-plus age bracket, is 5 hours 40 minutes at the age of 92, at the 2003 Toronto Waterfront Marathon.

Biography
Fauja Singh claims to have been born in Beas Pind, Jalandhar, Punjab, British India on 1 April 1911, the youngest of four children. Singh did not walk until he was five years old. His legs were thin and weak, and he could hardly walk long distances. Because of this, he was often teased, and he was called by the nickname "danda" ( for "stick") for the next ten years. As a young man, Singh was an avid amateur runner, but he gave it up at the time of the Partition of India.

It was only after witnessing the death of his fifth son, Kuldip, in a construction accident in August 1994, that Singh returned to his passion for running, in 1995. The death of his wife in 1992, and his eldest daughter who had died from complications after giving birth to his third granddaughter, gave him the determination for this new focus in life. He emigrated to England in the 1990s and lives with one of his sons in Ilford.

At 89 years, he took seriously to running and ended up in international marathon events. When he first turned up for training at Redbridge, Essex, he was dressed in a three-piece suit. The coach had to rework everything, including his attire. Singh ran his first race, the London Marathon, in 2000. According to his coach, he used to run up to 20 kilometres easily and wanted to run a marathon, thinking it to be just 26 kilometres and not 26 miles (42 kilometres). It was after he realised this that he began training seriously.

At the age of 93, Singh completed a marathon in 6 hours and 54 minutes, 58 minutes quicker than the world best for the 90-plus age bracket.

In 2004, he was featured in an advertising campaign for sportswear manufacturer Adidas alongside David Beckham and Muhammad Ali.

Singh bettered the UK records for the 200 m, 400 m, 800 m, mile and 3000 m for his, claimed, age group, all within a single 94-minute period, but they are not currently listed as records.

At the age of 100, Singh attempted and accomplished eight world age group records in one day, at the special Ontario Masters Association Fauja Singh Invitational Meet, held at Birchmount Stadium in Toronto, Ontario, Canada. Timed by officials in Canada, he ran the 100 metres in 23.14, 200 metres in 52.23, the 400 metres in 2:13.48, the 800 metres in 5:32.18, the 1500 metres in 11:27.81, the mile in 11:53.45, the 3000 metres in 24:52.47, and the 5000 metres in 49:57.39, setting five world records for his age group in one day. Some events had no previous record holder, as nobody over age 100 had ever attempted the distance. Some of his marks are significantly superior to the listed world record in the M95 age group as well.

Three days later, on 16 October 2011, Singh became the first 100-year-old to finish a marathon, completing the Toronto Waterfront Marathon in 8:11:06. As it took him over 14 minutes after the gun to cross the starting line, the official time submitted for the age group record will be 8:25:17.

Guinness World Records refused to include Singh in its record book because he could not produce his birth certificate to prove his age. Birth records were not kept in India in 1911 although Singh was able to produce a passport listing his date of birth as 1 April 1911, and a letter from Queen Elizabeth II congratulating him on his 100th birthday.

In October 2011, Singh, a vegetarian, became the oldest man to be featured in a PETA campaign.
In July 2012, Singh carried the Olympic torch.

Singh had stated that he would retire from competitive running after taking part in the Hong Kong marathon on 24 February 2013, five weeks shy of his 102nd birthday. He completed the 10 kilometre run at the Hong Kong marathon in 1 hour 32 minutes and 28 seconds, and said that he intends to continue running for pleasure, health and charity.

Singh was awarded the British Empire Medal (BEM) in the 2015 New Year Honours for services to sport and charity.

Singh is 1.72 m (5 ft 8 in) tall and weighs 52 kg (115 lb). He attributes his physical fitness and longevity to abstaining from smoking and alcohol and to following a simple vegetarian diet. He has been quoted as saying "I am very careful about different foods. My diet is simple phulka, dal, green vegetables, yogurt and milk. I do not touch parathas, pakoras, rice or any other fried food. I take lots of water and tea with ginger. ... I go to bed early taking the name of my Rabba (God) as I don’t want all those negative thoughts crossing my mind."

Speaking about the marathon, he said: "The first 20 miles are not difficult. As for last six miles, I run while talking to God."

Sikhs in the City
He is the eldest of a group of Sikhs who call themselves "Sikhs in the City". There were three other Sikhs, aged 79, 79 and 80, in the "Golden Oldies" team which ran the Edinburgh Marathon relay in 2009. The SITC running group are a now a well-established team based in East London, running marathons across the world with interfaith groups and raising money for Fauja Singh's charities.

Turbaned Tornado
His biography, titled Turbaned Tornado, was formally released in the Attlee Room of Britain's House of Lords on 7 July 2011 by Lord Anthony Young of Norwood Green and retired British Crown Court judge Sir Mota Singh. The book was written by Chandigarh-based columnist and writer Khushwant Singh.

Achievements
Running Career

Marathons run: London (6), Toronto (2), New York (1)
Marathon debut: London, 2000, aged 89
London Flora Marathon 2000: 6:54
London Flora Marathon 2001: 6:54
London Flora Marathon 2002: 6:45
Bupa Great North Run (Half Marathon) 2002:  2:39
London Flora Marathon 2003: 6:02
Toronto Waterfront Marathon 2003:  5:40
New York City Marathon 2003: 7:35
London Flora Marathon 2004: 6:07
Glasgow City Half Marathon 2004: 2:33
Capital Radio Help a London Child 10,000 m 2004:  1:08
Toronto Waterfront Half Marathon 2004: 2:29:59
Toronto Waterfront Marathon 2011: 8:11:0
London Marathon 2012 :  7:49:21
Hong Kong Marathon (10 km) 2012: 1:34 (raised $25,800 for charity)
parkrun uk 2012 – Age graded record holder: 179.04% with a time of 38:34
Hong Kong Marathon (10 km) 2013: 1:32:28

Awards
On 13 November 2003, Singh was awarded the Ellis Island Medal of Honor by the National Ethnic Coalition, a US group that advocates ethnic pride and tolerance. William Fugazy, the chairman of the coalition, said Singh is a symbol of racial tolerance, and his running helps bridge the gap created by the 11 September terrorist attacks. "He is the greatest inspiration," said Fugazy, and added that Singh was the first non-American to receive the honour. He was awarded the "Pride of India" title by a UK-based organisation for his achievements in 2011.

Punjab elections 2012
He attended an election rally at village Kukranwala under the Raja Sansi constituency (near Amritsar) for the People's Party of Punjab candidate, where he was reported to have extended his support for the party. However, the party was criticized by Sikhs in the City for the "misuse of Fauja Singh for political purposes", and for having "abused the vulnerability of an old man for its own ends".

Chardikala Run 2012
Fauja Singh was invited as a special guest for the 2nd Annual Chardikala Run in Malaysia. The run was given a theme '101 and running' as a mark of respect for Singh. He was given a warm crowd response and was also presented with The BrandLaureate Award on stage during the closing ceremony.

Singh was given a warm response by the people of Malaysia. He was escorted to the Chardikala Charitable Fun Run venue, Astaka in Petaling Jaya, by the Malaysian Bikers Group. Singh flagged off the start of the Marathon. Fauja Singh's attitude was praised especially because he had taken part in the Standard Chartered Singapore Marathon on the same morning, yet was in full spirits meeting, greeting and being a major part of the successful CCFR 2012.

References

External links
Passage on Fauja Singh, The Oldest Marathon Runner (Sikh Personalities)
"Life begins at 90" (BBC Sport)
Biography in The Sikh Times
REDIFF article regarding ADIDAS deal
Sikhs in the City Running Team
Roll Over Bannister, Article in Outlook magazine

Living people
British supercentenarians
Men supercentenarians
British male long-distance runners
Indian male long-distance runners
Indian Sikhs
Indian male marathon runners
World record holders in masters athletics
Longevity claims
People from Jalandhar
Indian emigrants to the United Kingdom
British Sikhs
Indian masters athletes
Recipients of the British Empire Medal
Naturalised citizens of the United Kingdom
Athletes from Punjab, India
Year of birth missing (living people)